The McAfee SiteAdvisor, later renamed as the McAfee WebAdvisor, is a service that reports on the safety of web sites by crawling the web and testing the sites it finds for malware and spam. A browser extension can show these ratings on hyperlinks such as on web search results. Users could formerly submit reviews of sites.

The service was originally developed by SiteAdvisor, Inc, an MIT startup first introduced at CodeCon on February 10, 2006, and later acquired by McAfee on April 5, 2006. Since its founding, it has received criticism for its improper rating of some sites, and more importantly the length of time it takes to resolve complaints.

Usage
Prior to mid-October 2014, the functionality of SiteAdvisor could be accessed by submitting a URL to the website at https://www.siteadvisor.com/sites/, but can now also be accessed through a downloadable Browser Plugin.

Sites are rated in levels of Safe (green tick), Suspicious (yellow exclamation mark) and Unsafe (red "X").

Additional features include:
 Rates email and IM links
 Indicates sites potentially harmful to your computer
 Allows users to safely shorten URLs when sharing links
 Alerts users to possible phishing and identity theft scams
 Redirects you away from red and yellow sites (if Protected Mode is enabled).

Products and services 
A paid version of McAfee SiteAdvisor, McAfee SiteAdvisor LIVE, is included in McAfee Total Protection and has extra features:
Download Protection - SiteAdvisor LIVE allows the consumer to adjust how aggressively SiteAdvisor scans downloads. This can stop downloads which are considered to be slightly, probably or possibly risky depending on setting determined by the user. This feature can also be turned off.
Protected Mode - Allows the user to set a password for SiteAdvisor to prevent users from accessing or downloading from Yellow and Red rated websites. This password will also be required to change any SiteAdvisor settings after Protected Mode has been enabled.

In addition to selling to the end consumers, as of 2017, McAfee also sells to the web site owners with their McAfee Secure program, which supposedly runs daily security checks and gives passing sites a "McAfee Secure" badge.

As of December 2010, McAfee Secure marketing materials say there are 350 million installs of McAfee SiteAdvisor, and a likely much larger viewer base with search engine agreements such as that with Yahoo.

A URL shortening service which advertised itself as "secure" was operated until mid-2018. Its defining feature was that it would deny redirecting to sites classified by SiteAdvisor as insecure, to provide users receiving a "mcaf.ee" URL with the confidence that they would not land on a malicious site.

Games and quizzes 
In March 2006, McAfee launched a JavaScript-based quiz which has users pick between sites rated as safe and unsafe.

A flash-based memory training game called "WebQuest" was launched around 2007.

Studies and research 
SiteAdvisor has published various reports regarding online threats such as typosquatting, where mistyped domains may lead to sites ranging from harmless pay-per-click and domain parking sites to pornographic and malware sites.

Criticism

False negatives
The very nature of SiteAdvisor and the long periods between site crawls mean that even if the SiteAdvisor tests were 100% accurate a Green rating offers no guarantee of safety. Malicious code and browser exploits often spread fast over large numbers of websites, meaning a Green rating may not be up to date and may provide a false sense of security.

TrustedSource
McAfee SiteAdvisor now makes use of the TrustedSource website reputation organisation, to act as something like a 'cloud' intelligence software to get the most up-to-date information on websites as possible, very similar to McAfee's Active Protection (Artemis) system. The details of this system are not known.

Awards
 Time magazine named SiteAdvisor.com among the 50 coolest websites of 2006.
 Popular Science awarded SiteAdvisor the "Best of What's New" award in the Computing category for 2006.
PC World ranked SiteAdvisor at #15 in "The 100 Best Products of 2007."

See also
Norton Safe Web
Website Reputation Ratings
WOT: Web of Trust

References

External links
 
 Safe report example (Wikipedia)
 Cautionary report example (whenu.com)
 Warning report example (sify-antispyware.co.cc)

McAfee
2005 software
Freeware
Reputation management
Windows software